The SIG Sauer CROSS is a light-weight bolt-action rifle manufactured by SIG Sauer's North American branch headquartered in Newington, New Hampshire in the United States, as a "precision hunting rifle" designed to "meet the demands of both precision long-range shooting and extreme back country hunting", available in three different calibers.  Announced in December 2019, it is the company's first bolt-action offering since the SSG 3000 was introduced in 1992.

The Cross is available on the civilian market in America from Sig Sauer.

Specifications 
The rifle is available in three chamberings: .308 Winchester, 6.5mm Creedmoor, or .277 FURY. The rifle is available in black or camouflage ("First Lite Cipher") finishes. It features a M-LOK attachment system. The folding stock features an adjustable cheek rest and shoulder pad.

Notes

References

External links
 
 SIG Unveils Cross Bolt Next Generation Precision Rifle via YouTube

Bolt-action rifles
Rifles of the United States
SIG Sauer rifles
Weapons and ammunition introduced in 2019